Rovte v Selški Dolini (in older sources also Rovte pri Svetem Lenartu) is a settlement in the Municipality of Škofja Loka in the Upper Carniola region of Slovenia.

Name
The name of the settlement was changed from Rovte to Rovte v Selški dolini (literally, 'Rovte in the Selca Valley') in 1955. In the past the German name was Rovte bei Sankt Leonhard (literally, 'Rovte near Sveti Lenart').

References

External links

Rovte v Selški Dolini at Geopedia

Populated places in the Municipality of Škofja Loka